Godfrey Wakaabu (born 1 January 1970) is a Ugandan boxer. He competed in the men's light welterweight event at the 1992 Summer Olympics.

References

External links
 

1970 births
Living people
Ugandan male boxers
Olympic boxers of Uganda
Boxers at the 1992 Summer Olympics
Place of birth missing (living people)
Light-welterweight boxers